Jezebel was a biblical figure, the wife of King Ahab. 

Jezebel(s) or Dyesebel may also refer to:

Butterflies
 Delias, a genus of butterflies in the family Pieridae commonly called the Jezebels
 Common Jezebel, Delias eucharis, a species of butterfly
 Painted Jezebel, Delias hyparete, a species of butterfly

Entertainment and media
 Jezebel (1938 film), a film starring Bette Davis and Henry Fonda
 Jezebel (2019 film), a film starring Tiffany Tenille and Numa Perrier
 Jezebel (website), a website aimed at women
 Jézabel, a novel by Irène Némirovsky published in 1936
 Jezabel (TV series), a Brazilian television series
 , a French webseries
 "Jezebels" (The Handmaid's Tale), a television episode

Characters
 Dyesebel, a fictional mermaid character in the Philippines
 Jezebel Baley, the wife of the character Elijah Baley in Isaac Asimov's Robot novels
 Jezebel or Jizabel Disraeli, a character in Kaori Yuki's manga series Earl Cain

Music
 Jezebel (album), a 1980 album by Jon Stevens
 The Jezabels, a band from Sydney, Australia

Songs
 "Jezebel" (Frankie Laine song), 1951
 "Jezebel" (Chely Wright song), 2001
 "Jezebel" (Jon Stevens song), 1979
 "Jezebel" (The Rasmus song), 2022
 "Jezebel", a song by 10,000 Maniacs on the album Our Time in Eden
 "Jezebel", a song by Acid Bath on the album When the Kite String Pops
 "Jezebel", a song by Boyz II Men on the album II
 "Jezebel", a song by Depeche Mode on the album Sounds of the Universe
 "Jezebel", a song by Dizzee Rascal on the album Boy in da Corner
 "Jezebel", a song by The Drones on the album Gala Mill
 "Jezebel", a song by Herman's Hermits on the album There's a Kind of Hush All Over the World
 "Jezebel", a song by Iron & Wine on the album Woman King
 "Jezebel", a song by Joan Jett on the album Bad Reputation
 "Jezebel", a song by Ky-Mani Marley on the album Radio
 "Jezabel", a song by Ricky Martin on the album Sound Loaded
 "Jezebel", a song by Recoil on the album Liquid
 "Jezebel", a song by The Reverend Horton Heat on the album Liquor in the Front
 "Jezebel", a song by Sade on the album Promise
 "Jezebel", a song by The Specials on the album Skinhead Girl
 "Jezebel", a song by Two Hours Traffic on the album Isolator
 "Jezebel", a song by Memphis May Fire on the album Challenger

Other uses
 Jezebel, a prophetess in the church of Thyatira in Revelation 2:20
 "Jezebel", a stereotype of a sexually voracious black woman and historical example of a negative stereotype
 Jezebel, a historic fire engine maintained by the RCS Motor Club
 Jezebel, a bare critical experiment at Los Alamos National Laboratory made of plutonium
 A family of US airborne long-range passive sonobuoy systems, including AN/AQA-3, AQA-4, AQA-5 and AQA-7
 Project Jezebel, part of the research for SOSUS (Sound Surveillance System)